LLG or variation, may refer to:

 The Landau–Lifshitz–Gilbert equation, used in micromagnetics
 Local government
 Local-level governments of Papua New Guinea
 The Logical Language Group
 Lole language (ISO 639 code: llg)
 Lycée Louis-le-Grand, a well known public high school in Paris
 Chillagoe Airport, IATA airport code "LLG"

See also

 
 2LG

 LG (disambiguation)